Gilberte Marcelle Lachmann (27 November 1917 – 15 January 2012), better known as Jeanne Manet, was a French film actress. After appearing in some French films, Manet moved to Hollywood. Originally regarded there as a rising starlet, her roles were generally supporting ones.

During the occupation of France, Manet starred in Vive la Liberté, a film made by the French underground.

In 1946, Manet wed Pat Hurst, who was then an Office of Strategic Services officer. After World War II ended, he returned to his former career of acting, and she temporarily retired. Actress Dorothy Lamour was credited with persuading Manet to leave retirement and return to acting.

Selected filmography
 Long Live Liberty (1946)
 Slightly French (1949)
 Operation Mad Ball (1957)
 The Flying Fontaines (1959)
 Pepe (1960)

References

Bibliography
 Troyan, Michael. A Rose for Mrs. Miniver: The Life of Greer Garson. University Press of Kentucky, 1999.

External links

1917 births
2012 deaths
20th-century French actresses
French emigrants to the United States
French film actresses
People from Houilles